Pierre Galle (born 13 January 1945) is a French former professional basketball player and coach.

Professional playing career
Galle was the French League Player of the Year, in 1973 and 1974.

National team career
Galle was a member of the senior French national basketball team, from 1968 to 1975.

Coaching career
As a head coach, he coached ASVEL Basket, from 1989 to 1991, Hyères-Toulon Var Basket, from 1992 to 1994, and other pro clubs.

Personal life
Galle's brother, Jean, is also a basketball coach.

References 

Living people
French men's basketball players
1945 births
ASVEL Basket coaches
Stade Auto Lyon players
Point guards
Shooting guards
Caen Basket Calvados players
Denain Voltaire Basket players
Berck Basket Club players
Montpellier Paillade Basket coaches